The following is the qualification system and qualified countries for the cycling at the 2019 Pan American Games competition in Lima, Peru.

Qualification system
A total of 250 (143 men and 107 women) cyclists will qualify to compete. 160 will qualify in road/track, 34 in mountain biking and 56 in BMX. Various events and rankings were used to determine the qualifiers. A nation could enter a maximum of 26 athletes, four in mountain biking (two per gender), six in BMX (three per gender) and a combined 16 for road and track (ten men and six women). Peru as host nation, was automatically awarded the maximum quota of 26 spots.

Qualification timeline

Qualification summary
A total of 26 countries qualified cyclists after reallocation. The qualification charts below do not represent qualified countries after reallocation. Two additional quotas were assigned for unknown reasons.

BMX

Racing
A maximum of 24 male and 16 female athletes will be allowed to compete in BMX racing. The host nation (Peru) automatically receives the maximum of two quota spots per event, and all other nations may qualify a maximum of two athletes per event. All qualification will be done using the UCI rankings as of December 31, 2018.

Men

Women

Freestyle
A maximum of eight male and eight female athletes will be allowed to compete in BMX freestyle. The host nation (Peru) automatically receives the maximum one quota spot per event, and all other nations may qualify a maximum of one athlete per event. All qualification will be done using the UCI rankings as of December 31, 2018.

Men

Women

Mountain biking
A maximum of 20 male and 14 female athletes will be allowed to compete in mountain biking. The host nation (Peru) automatically receives the maximum two quota spot per event, and all other nations may qualify a maximum of two athletes per event. Qualification was done across three tournaments. The defending champion in both events, Canada, decided not to compete in this discipline after the Pan American Championships date was changed at the last minute.

Men

Women

Road/Track
A maximum of 91 male and 69 female athletes will be allowed to compete in the road and track cycling events. The host nation (Peru) automatically receives the maximum 16 quotas (ten men and six women), and all other nations may qualify a maximum of 16 cyclists as well. Qualification was done across four tournaments.  Like in mountain biking, the defending champion in some of the road events from 2015, Canada, decided not to enter any athletes in the discipline.

Men
Host 
The host nation Peru, is permitted to enter 10 male cyclists.

Pan American Road Championships
At the Pan American Championships, the top five men in the individual time trial and top 12 in the road race qualified, for a total of 17.

South American Games
The winner of each event, along with the top two in the road race qualified.

Central American and Caribbean Games
The winner of each event qualified.

Pan American Track Championships
The top two in team pursuit, omnium and madison qualified, along with the top 3 in the other three events.

Caribbean Championships
The top two athletes in the time trial along with the four best in the road race qualified.

Women
Host 
The host nation Peru, is permitted to enter 6 female cyclists.

Pan American Road Championships
At the Pan American Championships, the top three women in the individual time trial and top 10 in the road race qualified, for a total of 13.

South American Games
The winner of each event (except the madison), along with the top three in the road race qualified.

Central American and Caribbean Games
The winner of each event qualified, except the madison. However, the team sprint was not held, meaning the quotas were transferred to the madison event.

Pan American Track Championships
The top two in each event qualified

Caribbean Championships
The top two athletes in the time trial along with the two best in the road race qualified.

References

Cycling at the 2019 Pan American Games
2018 in road cycling
2018 in track cycling
2018 in BMX
2018 in mountain biking
Qualification for the 2019 Pan American Games